Christine Egerszegi-Obrist (born 29 May 1948) is a Swiss politician.  She was a member of the Swiss Council of States from 2007 to 2015 and the National Council from 1995 to 2007.  From 2006 to 2007, she was the President of the Swiss National Council. In the 2007 federal election, she became the first female representative of Aargau in the Council of States.

External links

Members of the National Council (Switzerland)
Presidents of the National Council (Switzerland)
Members of the Council of States (Switzerland)
1948 births
Living people
Women members of the National Council (Switzerland)
Women members of the Council of States (Switzerland)
Aargau politicians
FDP.The Liberals politicians
20th-century Swiss women politicians
21st-century Swiss women politicians
20th-century Swiss politicians
21st-century Swiss politicians